The Primary School Songbooks (Shōgaku Shōka Shū) are a series of songbooks compiled for school education by the Japanese Ministry of Education's music education group, which was founded in 1879 by Isawa Shuji. The songbooks were published from 1879 through 1884 in three volumes. The staff notation were used for the first time in Japan.

Volume I included 33 songs; Volume II, 16 songs; and Volume III, 42 songs. They were mostly originally made Japanese songs, but included some translated songs, such as from "Hänschen klein" in Volume 1, from "Alle Vögel sind schon da" in Volume II, and from "The Last Rose of Summer" in Volume III.

See also  
Music of Japan
Monbushō shōka
Translated songs (Japanese)

References

External link
Primary School Songbooks, edited by Isawa shuji (Tamagawa University) (in Japanese)

Primary education
Music education
Meiji period